'Sweetie™' is the trademark for apples of the 'PremA280' cultivar. This apple originated as a seedling from 'Royal Gala' × 'Braeburn', that ripens slightly before 'Royal Gala'. PLU code 3628 has been issued for this apple.

References 

Apple cultivars
New Zealand apples
Trademarks